The M Countdown Chart is a record chart on the South Korean Mnet television music program M Countdown. Every week, the show awards the best-performing single on the chart in the country during its live broadcast.

In 2012, 28 singles ranked number one on the chart and 26 music acts were awarded first-place trophies. Nine songs collected trophies for three weeks and achieved a triple crown: "Twinkle" by Girls' Generation-TTS, "The Chaser" by Infinite, "Electric Shock" by f(x), "Sexy, Free & Single" by Super Junior, "Beautiful Night" by Beast, "Gangnam Style" by Psy, "Crayon" by G-Dragon, "1,2,3,4" by Lee Hi, and "Return" by Lee Seung-gi. No release for the year earned a perfect score, but "Twinkle" by Girls' Generation-TTS acquired the highest point total on the May 10 broadcast with a score of 9,357.

Scoring system

22 December 2011 – 23 August 2012 
Digital Single Sales 45%, Album Sales 10%, Global Fan Vote 15%, Mnet Broadcasting 5%, Preferences of Music Experts 10%, Real-Time Charts 5%, SMS Vote 10%.

30 August 2012 – 20 February 2014 
Digital Single Sales 50%, Album Sales 10%, Age Preference 20%, Global Fan Vote 5%, Live Show Preferences 10%, SMS Vote 5%.

Chart history

References 

2012 in South Korean music
2012 record charts
Lists of number-one songs in South Korea